Martha Brill Olcott (born 1949) is an American expert on Central Asia and the Caspian. She was a senior associate with the Russian and Eurasian Program at the Carnegie Endowment for International Peace, co-directing the Carnegie Moscow Center's Project on Ethnicity and Politics in the former Soviet Union. She taught political science at Colgate University from 1975 until 1998. She joined the Carnegie Foundation in 1995. She previously served as a special consultant to Acting United States Secretary of State Lawrence Eagleburger and as director of the Central Asian American Enterprise Fund.

She received her graduate degrees from the University of Chicago.

Views 

She has criticized the amount of aid the U.S. government gives to Central Asian entities, saying, "The United States has had declining influence in the area and this isn't going to stop it [the decline]." She also says the government focuses too much on Afghanistan.

Olcott has commented on the effects of the global financial crisis on Central Asia.  She has indicated her support for economic development to continue here as an extension of economic integration with Russia and China, as well as an increase in aid and investment from international financial institutions.

Books
(links to Google Books)
Kazakhstan: Unfulfilled Promise
Getting it Wrong: Regional Cooperation and the Commonwealth of Independent States
Russia After Communism
The Kazakhs

References

Central Asian studies scholars
Historians of Central Asia
Terrorism in Central Asia
Living people
1949 births
SUNY Buffalo alumni
University of Chicago alumni
Colgate University faculty